Tachchampatti  is a village in the Annavasal revenue block of Pudukkottai district, Tamil Nadu, India.

Demographics 

As per the 2001 census, Tachchampatti had a total population of 665 with 344 males and 321 females. Out of the total population, 364 people were literate.

References

Villages in Pudukkottai district